Majoli is a surname. Notable people with the surname include:

Alex Majoli (born 1971), Italian photographer
Iva Majoli (born 1977), Croatian tennis player 
Monica Majoli (born 1963), American artist
Simone Majoli (1520–1597), Italian canon lawyer, bishop, and author

See also
Majuli